Seth Sukhdev Udhavdas (born 1896) was a Sindhi landlord and anti-colonial politician associated with the Indian National Congress. After partition, he chose to stay in Pakistan and allied with the Pakistan National Congress. In July 1949, Sukhdev was inducted as the non-Muslim representative of Sindh in the Constituent Assembly of Pakistan since Jairamdas Daulatram —the erstwhile representative in the Constituent Assembly of India on a Congress ticket— chose to stay in India.

Notes

References 

Pakistani politicians
1896 births
Year of death missing